Havelock L. Torrey (February 13, 1867 – April 1, 1949) was a farmer and political figure in Nova Scotia, Canada. He represented Guysborough County in the Nova Scotia House of Assembly from 1937 to 1945 as a Liberal member. His surname also appears as Tory in some sources.

He was born in Guysborough, Nova Scotia, the son of James A. Torrey and Mary Eliza McGregor. Torrey married Maria DesBarres. He was also superintendent of projects for a construction company. Torrey served on the county council for Guysborough County, also serving as warden. He died in Halifax at the age of 82.

References 
 

1867 births
1949 deaths
Nova Scotia Liberal Party MLAs
Nova Scotia municipal councillors
People from Guysborough County, Nova Scotia